Patrick Friou (born 8 January 1955) is a former French racing cyclist. He rode in four editions of the Tour de France between 1978 and 1981.

References

External links
 

1955 births
Living people
French male cyclists
People from Saintes, Charente-Maritime
Sportspeople from Charente-Maritime
Cyclists from Nouvelle-Aquitaine
20th-century French people